10,000 Maniacs is an American alternative rock band that was founded in 1981. They have released nine studio albums, six EPs, and five live albums. They achieved their most significant success between 1987 and 1993, when they released four albums that charted in the top 50 in the US: In My Tribe (1987), Blind Man's Zoo (1989), Our Time in Eden (1992) and the live album MTV Unplugged (1993). After the recording but before the release of MTV Unplugged, original lead singer and songwriter Natalie Merchant left the band to pursue a solo career, while the remaining members continued the band.

History

Early years

The band was formed as Still Life in 1981 in Jamestown, New York, by Dennis Drew (keyboards), Steven Gustafson (bass), Chet Cardinale (drums), Robert Buck (guitar) and Buck's ex-wife Terri Newhouse (vocals). Gustafson invited Natalie Merchant, who was 17 at the time, to do some vocals. John Lombardo, who was in a band named The Mills (along with brother guitarist/vocalists Mark Liuzzo and Paul Liuzzo and drummer Mike Young) and used to play occasionally with Still Life, was invited to join permanently on guitar and vocals. Newhouse and Cardinale left the band in July, and Merchant became the main singer. Various drummers came and left. The band changed its name to Burn Victims and then to 10,000 Maniacs, inspired by the 1964 low-budget horror movie Two Thousand Maniacs!.

They performed as 10,000 Maniacs for the first time on Labor Day, September 7, 1981, with a line-up of Merchant, Lombardo, Buck, Drew, Gustafson, and Tim Edborg on drums. Edborg left and Bob "Bob O Matic" Wachter was on drums for most of the 1981 gigs. Tired of playing cover songs—though their first notable American hit was a cover of the Cat Stevens hit "Peace Train"—the band started to write their own music, usually with Merchant handling the lyrics and Lombardo the music. In March 1982, with Jim Foti on drums, the band recorded an EP album titled Human Conflict Number Five. More gigs followed in 1982. During this time they lived in Atlanta, Georgia, for a short period at the encouragement of friends who said that many gigs were available there. Discouraged by the lack of actual gigs, and by having to sell plasma and rake leaves to buy food, the band moved back to Jamestown in November 1982 to regroup.

At the beginning of 1983, Jerry Augustyniak joined the band as their permanent drummer. The Maniacs met Augustyniak when they played in Buffalo, New York, where he was in a punk band named the Stains. Between March and July, the band recorded songs for a second record, Secrets of the I Ching, their debut album, which was pressed by Mark Records for the band's own label Christian Burial Music. The record was well received by critics and caught the attention of respected BBC Radio 1 DJ John Peel in London. One song, "My Mother the War", turned out to be a minor hit in the United Kingdom and entered the independent singles chart. The band toured extensively during 1983 and 1984, and played gigs in the UK.

Peter Leak, an Englishman living in New York City, became interested in the band, made contact and was made their manager. With the help of Leak and Elektra Records A & R (artists and repertoire) man Howard Thompson, 10,000 Maniacs signed to Elektra in November 1984. In the spring of 1985, they recorded their second album, The Wishing Chair, in London at Livingston Studios, with Joe Boyd as producer. Though the album was not a blockbuster hit, its status as the band's major label debut did win it some notice, and it received significant critical acclaim.

Breakthrough success
Frustrated with the lack of success and direction of the band, co-founder Lombardo left 10,000 Maniacs during a rehearsal on July 14, 1986. The remaining five members started recording a new album in Los Angeles with Peter Asher as the producer, who had worked extensively with artists such as James Taylor and Linda Ronstadt. In My Tribe, a more pop-rock oriented record, was released on July 7, 1987. The album stayed on the charts for 77 weeks, peaking at No. 37, and established a large U.S. audience for the group. It was also well received in the UK. The album originally contained the band's cover of "Peace Train", but the song was removed from subsequent pressings after the song's writer Cat Stevens (now Yusuf Islam) made comments implying he agreed with a death fatwa against author Salman Rushdie.

10,000 Maniacs' next album, 1989's Blind Man's Zoo, hit No. 13 and went gold, further increasing the group's following. In May 1989, the British music magazine NME reported that 10,000 Maniacs had won the songwriter category prize at the New York Music Awards. In 1990, with the help of Lombardo, they remastered their first two records, Human Conflict Number Five and Secrets of the I Ching, and released them as a compilation titled Hope Chest: The Fredonia Recordings 1982–1983. Lombardo and Mary Ramsey, who had formed a folk-rock act named John & Mary, opened gigs for the Maniacs on the Hope Chest Tour in 1990.

The band played a handful of local concerts in 1991, but largely took a break from touring and Merchant spent most of the year working with homeless youth in Harlem. Merchant then revealed to the other members that she would be leaving 10,000 Maniacs for a solo career in two years' time, allowing for additional 10,000 Maniacs albums, while also acknowledging the financial implications of her departure. A new album, Our Time in Eden, was released on September 29, 1992. In 1993, the band performed at the MTV Inaugural Ball for President Clinton in January and on MTV Unplugged on April 21. Merchant made her departure from the band public in an interview on MTV on August 5, 1993, saying she "didn't want art by committee anymore." The MTV Unplugged album was released on October 26, 1993. "The last 10,000 Maniacs gig (July 28, 1993) was the first time I'd got drunk in nearly two years," Merchant later recalled. "I laughed a lot and threw lots of flowers out of the hotel window."

1994–2001

After Merchant's departure, Elektra Records dropped the band while signing Merchant as a solo artist. The remaining members of 10,000 Maniacs (Augustyniak, Buck, Drew and Gustafson) asked John & Mary to join the band. The revamped band began performing new material almost immediately, initially calling themselves John & Mary, Rob, Steve, Dennis, & Jerry; then they were able to legally regain control of the 10,000 Maniacs name. 10,000 Maniacs released two albums with Ramsey on vocals. In 1997, they released Love Among the Ruins with the band on a new label, Geffen Records, from which their cover of the Roxy Music song "More Than This" became a moderate hit, and followed up in 1999 with The Earth Pressed Flat on Bar/None.

In December 1998, Buck took some time off from the band, moving to Texas to focus on a new project named League of Blind Women. 10,000 Maniacs recruited Buffalo-based Michael Lee Jackson of the band Animal Planet to step into the lead guitar role. Buck returned to the band in the summer of 1999. On November 3, 2000, 10,000 Maniacs played with the Buffalo Philharmonic Orchestra in Buffalo, New York. It was the last concert they performed with Buck. On December 19, 2000, Buck died of liver failure at the age of 42. He was buried in the Mission Covenant Church Cemetery in Sugar Grove, Pennsylvania.

Following Buck's death, 10,000 Maniacs took a break. Gustafson and Drew, with Jeff Erickson, started a band named The Mighty Wallop!. Augustyniak joined a band named Only Humen. On December 5, 2001, a 10,000 Maniacs line-up comprising Gustafson, Drew, Augustyniak, Lombardo and Ramsey played a benefit concert in Toronto, with Buck's former guitar technician, Erickson, on lead guitar.

2002–2007

In 2002, Gustafson, Drew, and Augustyniak decided that they wished to continue 10,000 Maniacs with a new lead singer. Lombardo showed up at the first band practice, found out that the band had hired Erickson to play lead guitar and Oskar Saville of the Chicago-based band Rubygrass to sing, and quit the band. This lineup toured sporadically between 2002 and 2006, playing at various festivals.

On January 27, 2004, Elektra/Asylum/Rhino Records released Campfire Songs: The Popular, Obscure and Unknown Recordings, a two-CD set compilation, with 31 digitally remastered songs, four of them demos and one unreleased. The second disc contained B-sides and outtakes throughout the band's career up to that point, including many covers. Jackson Browne's "These Days" and Tom Waits' "I Hope That I Don't Fall in Love with You" were among those included.

In 2006, John & Mary formed a folk-rock band named the Valkyries. John & Mary & the Valkyries are composed of several longtime Buffalo music scene stalwarts. Ramsey rejoined the current edition of the band for several dates in 2006, playing viola and singing backing vocals. Saville left in 2007, and Ramsey regained the lead vocalist spot.

2008–present

The band—consisting of Augustyniak, Drew, Erickson, Gustafson and Ramsey—remains active, playing shows throughout the United States. In June 2011, the band released the EP |Triangles on its own label, Ruby Wristwatch Records. The band celebrated its 30th anniversary in October 2011 with two sold-out concerts at the Scharmann Theater on the campus of Jamestown Community College. The band spent most of 2012 recording a new album at their studio in Jamestown, New York. In February 2013, they released the album, titled Music from the Motion Picture.

Former drummer Robert Wachter died on March 26, 2013, at the age of 49 due to a long illness.

Twice Told Tales, an album of traditional British Isles covers, was released on April 28, 2015, on Cleopatra Records. Founding member John Lombardo was brought back into the fold as creative director and to play guitar on the album and following tour. 10,000 Maniacs released its live album Playing Favorites on June 3, 2016, their first live album with Mary Ramsey on lead vocals.

40th anniversary
The band celebrated their 40th anniversary in 2022 with an extensive tour, billed as 10,000 Maniacs featuring Mary Ramsey, to avoid any confusion as to the status of Natalie Merchant in the band. Ramsey acknowledged the legacy of the band, and the band with Merchant, stating "There are still times when I get mistaken for her, and I feel like it's just part of the story. In the beginning it was different, because people obviously wanted to see her — that's an understandable situation. But time has healed things up a bit, the wounds and the expectations." In 2014, Merchant looked back to her time with the band, "I learned so much with 10,000 Maniacs and have great memories being with that band. I'll never forget 1987 when it became so crazy. It was exciting and insane in terms of the schedule. It was so intense I was hospitalized. I look back fondly on that period. But I don't think the world is craving Natalie Merchant and 10,000 Maniacs." In 2002, when Merchant was asked if she would ever get back together with the band for a tour, she stated that due to Buck's death they could never again play together as a band.

Keyboardist Dennis Drew reflected on the 40-year history of the band, "You don't grow up thinking you're going to do anything for 40 years. To get to this point, it's amazing. It doesn't feel like 40 years. It's been as natural as everything else. We have families, kids and grand-kids on the way. It's just been our life. You don't retire from this, I don't think. They'll have to take us off the stage on stretchers."

Band members

 Current
 Dennis Drew – keyboards, backing vocals, rare occasional lead vocals (1981–present)
 Steve Gustafson – bass guitar, guitar, backing vocals, rare occasional lead vocals (1981–present)
 Jerry Augustyniak – drums, backing vocals (1983–present)
 Mary Ramsey – lead vocals, violin, viola (1993–2001, 2007–present)
 Jeff Erickson – guitar, occasional lead vocals (2001–present, guest appearance in 1998)
 John Lombardo – guitar, bass guitar, occasional lead vocals (1981–1986, 1994–2002, 2015– present, touring member other years)

 Former
 Rob Buck – guitar, synthesizers, mandolin, pedal steel, sitar, banjo, mandocello (1981–1998, 1999–2000; died 2000)
 Chet Cardinale – drums (1981)
 Teri Newhouse - vocals (1981)
 Natalie Merchant – lead vocals, piano (1981–1993)
 Tim Edborg – drums (1981)
 James Rocky Calavitta – saxophone (1981)
 Debbie Heverly – piano (1981)
 Duane Calhoun – lead guitar (1981)
 Bob "O'Matic" Wachter – drums (1982; died 2013)
 Jim Foti – drums (1982–1983)
 Oskar Saville – lead vocals (2002–2007)

 Touring members
 John Lombardo – guitar (1990, various special guest appearances other years)
 Mary Ramsey – violin, viola, backing vocals (1990, 1992–1993, 2006–2007)
 Morgan Fichter – violin, backing vocals (1992–1993)
 Amanda Kramer – piano, acoustic guitar, backing vocals (1992–1993) 
 Michael Lee Jackson – lead guitar (1998–1999)
 Max Weinberg – drums (1992)
 Kevin Osborne – trombone (1992–1993)
 Tommy LaBella – alto saxophone (1992–1993, 2013–2019)
 Tony White – tenor saxophone, horn arranger (1992–1993, 2002–2003, 2013–2019)
 Scott Burrows – trombone (1993)
 Levi E Swanson – lead trombone (2003–2008)
 Maria Sebastian – acoustic guitar, backing vocals (2010–2011)
 Melanie Luciano – acoustic guitar, backing vocals (2012–2014, 2015, 2020)
 Savannah King – acoustic guitar, backing vocals (2014–2015)
 Amanda Barton – acoustic guitar, backing vocals, violin, tambourine (2015–2016)
 Inga Yanoski – viola, violin, backing vocals (2016–2018)
 Noelle Hone – backing vocals (2006, 2018)
 Maggie Zindle – violin, viola, backing vocals (2018–)

Timeline

Discography

Albums

Studio albums

Extended plays
Human Conflict Number Five (1982)
You Happy Puppet (1989)
Candy Everybody Wants (1993)
Few & Far Between (1993)
|Triangles (2011)
For Crying Out Loud (2016)

Live

Compilations

Singles

Other releases

Filmography

Television

References

External links

 

 

 
Alternative rock groups from New York (state)
Elektra Records artists
Female-fronted musical groups
Jamestown, New York
Musical groups established in 1981
Musical quartets
American folk rock groups
Natalie Merchant
College rock musical groups